Notostigma foreli is a species of ant belonging to the genus Notostigma, which is native to Australia. It was described by Emery in 1920.

References

External links

Video of ant worker of the species

Formicinae
Insects described in 1920
Hymenoptera of Australia
Insects of Australia